Leonardo Baremboin (born 20 August 1950) is an Argentine former swimmer. He competed in three events at the 1968 Summer Olympics.

References

1950 births
Living people
Argentine male swimmers
Olympic swimmers of Argentina
Swimmers at the 1968 Summer Olympics
Swimmers from Buenos Aires
20th-century Argentine people